The United Nations Educational, Scientific and Cultural Organization (UNESCO) World Heritage Sites are places of importance to cultural or natural heritage as described in the UNESCO World Heritage Convention, established in 1972. There are four UNESCO World Heritage Sites in Wales, as part of the 33 in the United Kingdom (UK) and the British Overseas Territories.

The Castles and Town Walls of King Edward in Gwynedd (named after the then larger Gwynedd county) was the first site designated exclusively within Wales and alongside the other six sites in the United Kingdom first designated in 1986. Whereas the Slate Landscape of Northwest Wales is Wales' and the UK's newest site designated on 28 July 2021. All of the World Heritage Sites in Wales are designated as "cultural".

Ratification of the constitution of UNESCO was performed by the UK in 1946. The United Kingdom National Commission for UNESCO advises the UK Government, which is overall responsible for maintaining World Heritage Sites across the UK, on policies regarding UNESCO. The UK Government's Department for Culture, Media and Sport (DCMS) is the responsible department representing the UK's general compliance with the convention to UNESCO. Nominating sites and co-ordinating directly to UNESCO is reserved to the UK Government, however the powers to oversee, protect and manage historic sites is devolved to Wales. Cadw, on behalf of the Welsh Government, is responsible to identify, submit and discuss potential World Heritage Site contenders or concerns over existing sites to the DCMS for review, aswell as Wales' specific compliance to the convention in regards to local protection policy. Local authorities in Wales, through their spatial planning systems, have the responsibilities to oversee any potentially inappropriate development near World Heritage Sites and to develop local protection plans for the sites, if appropriate.

World Heritage Sites 
UNESCO lists sites under ten criteria; each entry must meet at least one of the criteria under either "cultural" or "natural". Criteria i through vi are "cultural", which applies to all of Wales' sites.

References

External links 
 Conservation of historic buildings and monuments portal

Wales
Welsh culture